Liuhebafaquan (六合八法拳; Pinyin: liùhébāfǎquán, literally Six Harmonies Eight Methods Boxing) is an internal Chinese martial art.  It has been called "Xinyi Liuhebafa" 心意六合八法拳 and is also referred to as "water boxing" (shuǐquán 水拳) due to its principles.

History 
The Song Dynasty Taoist sage Chen Tuan (Chén Tuán 陳摶, also known as Chén Xīyí 陳希夷 or by his nickname, Chen Po) is often credited with its origin and development. He was associated with the Huashan Taoist Monastery on Mount Hua in Shaanxi Province.

The Liuhebafa form "Zhú Jī 築基" was taught in the late 1930s in Shanghai and Nanjing by Wu Yihui (1887–1958). It is said he had learned the art from three teachers: Yan Guoxing, Chen Guangdi (who learned the art from a monk, Da Yuan and a Taoist, Li Chan), and Chen Helu.

Many of Wu Yihui's students had martial arts backgrounds and modified the form to merge it with their own knowledge. This is one of several explanations for its similarities with other martial arts such as Xingyiquan, Baguazhang, T'ai chi and Yiquan.

Six Harmonies and Eight Methods 
The Six Harmonies and the Eight Methods are the guiding principles of Liuhebafa that give it its name.

Six Harmonies, 六合 
 體合於心 (Pinyin: tǐ hé yū xīn) Body and Mind Combine
 心合於意 (xīn hé yū yì) Mind and Intent Combine
 意合於氣 (yì hé yū qì) Intent and Chi Combine
 氣合於神 (qì hé yū shén) Chi and Spirit Combine
 神合於動 (shén hé yū dòng) Spirit and Movement Combine
 動合於空 (dòng hé yū kōng) Movement and Emptiness Combine

Eight Methods, 八法 
 氣 (qì) Chi
 骨 (gǔ) Bone
 形 (xíng) Shape
 隨 (suí) Follow
 提 (tí) Rise
 還 (huán) Return
 勒 (lè) Retain
 伏 (fú) Conceal
There are other translations and links possible

Forms 
The system of Liuhebafa, called Huayue Xiyi Men, as taught by Wu Yihui contains several forms (套路 taòlù), including bare hand and weapons forms as well as qigong methods.

Hand forms 
 三盤十二勢  Sān Pán Shí Èr Shì – 3 Divisions, 12 Spirits (1. Dragon, 2. Phoenix, 3. Tiger, 4. Crane, 5. Leopard, 6. Ape, 7. Bear, 8. Goose, 9. Snake, 10. Hawk, 11. Roc, 12. Kylin)
 築基        Zhú Jī – Discovering the Foundations
 呂紅八勢    Lǚ Hóng Bā Shì – 8 Essences of Lǚ Hóng's Fist
 龍虎戰      Lóng Hǔ Zhàn – Dragon and Tiger Fighting
 螫龍遊      Zhē Lóng Yóu – Coiled Dragon Swimming
 螫龍拳      Zhē Lóng Quán – Coiled Dragon Fist

Weapon forms 
 心意棍     Xīn Yì Gùn – Heart of Intent Staff
 露花刀     Lù Huā Dāo – Dew Mist Broadsword
 玉川劍     Yù Chuān Jiàn – Jade River Straight Sword

Internal exercises 
 韋佗功     Wéi Tuó Gōng – Standing meditation
 太陽功     Tài Yáng Gōng – Solar Meditation
 一杰混元功 Yī Jié Hún Yuán Gōng – Primary Definitive Force
 先天座 Xiān Tiān Zuò – Pre-Heaven Meditation
 三盤推手   Sān Pán Tuī Shǒu – 3 Divisions Push Hands

See also 
Chen Tuan
Wu Yi Hui
Chan Yik Yan
Zhang Chang Xin

References

External links 
 WaterSpirit-6x8
 International Liuhebafa Internal Arts Association
 Information and instruction in LHBF
 Information on Lok Hup Ba Fa

Chinese martial arts
Neijia